The 2015 Rally Sweden was a motor racing event for rally cars that was held over four days between 12 and 15 February 2015. It marked the sixty-third running of the Rally Sweden, and was the second round of the 2015 World Rally Championship, WRC-2 and WRC-3 seasons.

Sébastien Ogier won the rally on the last stage to extend his lead in the drivers' championship. The rally started with Pontus Tidemand, competing in a WRC-2 Ford Fiesta RRC, winning the Thursday night super special stage in Karlstad. Ogier took the lead on Friday's opening stage, with teammate Jari-Matti Latvala chasing him for the lead. Volkswagen's third driver, Andreas Mikkelsen gained the lead on the ninth stage, after Ogier and Latvala both hit snow banks, dropping to 4th and 23rd respectively. Mikkelsen kept the lead until Saturday's final stage, where Hyundai's Thierry Neuville took the lead after fitting new tyres for the stage; Mikkelsen and Ogier were both in contention however, at deficits of 1.5 and 9.6 seconds respectively. Mikkelsen regained the lead on Sunday's opening stage, and held a three-second lead over Ogier ahead of the final stage, Värmullsåsen, which was also the event's power stage, offering additional drivers' championship points.

Running in reverse order to their rally positions, Ogier bested Neuville's time for the stage – ultimately, the stage's fastest time – and just after he completed the stage, Mikkelsen hit a snow bank and lost 40 seconds to fall behind Neuville in the standings as well. Ott Tänak finished fourth to record his best WRC result since 2012, while Hayden Paddon recorded his best WRC finish – replacing the injured Dani Sordo – in fifth position. Next in the order was British duo Elfyn Evans and Kris Meeke, Martin Prokop finished eighth ahead of Yuriy protasov, who took his first WRC stage win, on the Kirkenær stage. Completing the championship points was Mads Østberg, who was in position for a podium spot, until he hit a snow bank on the eleventh stage. He also scored an extra point by finishing third on the power stage. After the last stage, Volkswagen Motorsport decided to retire Latvala's car – he had managed to recover up the order to 12th place – due to a rules loophole in relation to the following event, Rally México.

Entry list

Results

Event standings

Special stages

Notes:
 — The Röjden stage started in Sweden and finished in Norway after crossing the Sweden-Norway border.

Power Stage
The "Power stage" was the second running of the  Värmullsåsen stage at the end of the rally, which awarded championship points to the fastest three drivers through the stage.

References

External links

 Results at eWRC.com

Sweden
Swedish Rally
Rally